Remy Hii (born 24 July 1986) is a Malaysian actor. Hii attended the National Institute of Dramatic Art for three years, and appeared in various theatre productions, before being cast in his first television role. Hii starred as Van Tuong Nguyen in the four-part miniseries Better Man and was cast as Hudson Walsh in the soap opera Neighbours in 2013. He is also known as Prince Jingim from the Netflix original series Marco Polo. From 2018 to 2019, Hii played Simon Van Reyk in the Australian television crime drama Harrow. Hii has also appeared in the series Sisters, the romantic comedy film Crazy Rich Asians, and Marvel's Spider-Man: Far From Home.

Early life
Hii was born in Malaysia to a Chinese-Malaysian father and a British mother from Manchester. His father's family left China during the Cultural Revolution and settled in Malaysia like many others. He moved with his parents to Townsville, Queensland when he was eight. He attended the Queensland University of Technology. His early theatre work was with The Emerge Project, an arm of Switchboard Arts. There he performed in a number of original productions in Brisbane by local playwrights between 2005 and 2007. From 2009 to 2011 he attended the National Institute of Dramatic Art (NIDA) in Sydney where he graduated in 2011. During his time at NIDA, Hii played in the Sydney indie-rock group RAPIDS, alongside Will Shepherd, and fellow actors Angus McLaren and Jamie Timony. The band released a self-titled EP in 2010.

Career
Hii's professional theatre debut was with the Queensland Theatre Company's production of The Estimator in 2007, after he was noticed by its playwright David Brown performing in a play reading with The Emerge Project. He was later cast in guest roles in the television series East of Everything and H2O: Just Add Water. In 2011, Hii appeared as Tom in the short film Kiss. Hii appeared in the lead role of Van Tuong Nguyen in SBS's four-part miniseries Better Man, which began airing from 25 July 2013. The series is based on a true story. The role led to Hii receiving a nomination for Best Lead Actor in a Television Drama at the 2014 AACTA Awards and the Most Outstanding Newcomer accolade the 2014 Logie Awards.

On 12 June 2013, Hii joined the cast of Neighbours as Hudson Walsh. Hudson was introduced as a love interest for established character Chris Pappas (James Mason). On 20 June, Hii told Daniel Kilkelly from Digital Spy that he had been asked back to continue filming the following month. After leaving Neighbours, Hii was cast as Prince Jingim in the Netflix drama Marco Polo. The series was cancelled after two seasons in 2016. Hii went on to appear in Paul Currie's 2017 thriller film 2:22, and he has a recurring role as Sam in the Australian television drama Sisters. Hii portrays Alistair Cheng in the 2018 romantic comedy film Crazy Rich Asians, based on the novel of the same name by Kevin Kwan.

From 2018 to 2019, he played Simon Van Reyk, a forensic pathologist, in the crime drama Harrow. He appeared in every episode of the first series. In 2019, Hii played Brad Davis in Spider-Man: Far From Home. He was set to have the lead role of Luen in Jane the Novela, a spin-off from Jane the Virgin, but the series was not picked up by The CW. In February 2021, Hii starred as Ben Zhao in the ABC comedy-drama series Aftertaste. Later that year, Hii joined the ensemble cast of The Princess Switch 3: Romancing the Star.

Filmography

Film

Television

References

External links

 

Male actors from Queensland
Australian male film actors
Australian male soap opera actors
Australian people of Chinese descent
Australian people of English descent
Australian people of Malaysian descent
Living people
Logie Award winners
Male actors of Chinese descent
National Institute of Dramatic Art alumni
Year of birth uncertain
21st-century Australian male actors
Australian people of Asian descent
Australian actors of Asian descent
1986 births